These are the number-one albums in the United States per Billboard magazine during the year 1961. From May 25, 1959 through July 1963, separate charts existed for albums in mono and stereo formats. Beginning 1961, these charts were called Top LP's - Action Albums - Monaural and Top LP's - Action Albums - Stereophonic. From the beginning of April 1961, the names changed to Top LP's - 150 Best-Selling Mono LP's and Top LP's - 50 Best-Selling Stereo LP's. On May 8, 1961, the mono chart's name was changed again to Top LP's - 150 Best-Selling Monaural LP's.

Chart history

See also
1961 in music
List of number-one albums (United States)

References

1961
Number-one albums of 1961 (U.S.)